Slav (lit. Quail) was a Jewish village and an Israeli settlement in the Gush Katif settlement bloc, located in the south-west edge of the Gaza Strip until 2005.

History
Slav was founded as a paramilitary Nahal settlement in 1980. The settlement was named after the bird that the Israelites ate in the desert during the Exodus from Egypt.

In 1982, with the signing of the Israel-Egypt Peace Treaty and subsequent withdrawal from the Sinai Peninsula, Slav became a transit camp of former residents evicted from Sinai and temporary home to the Midreshet Hadarom girl's seminary. At the beginning of the 90's, the location was divided into a military base and a residential civilian area with several families. In 2001, a small group of people including staff and students of the nearby 'Otzem' pre-military preparatory school in Bnei Atzmon moved to settle the village and strengthen its numbers.

Unilateral disengagement
The 12 families of Slav left their homes on August 21, 2005, as part of Israel's unilateral disengagement plan. The houses were destroyed and the area was abandoned.
 

Former Israeli settlements in the Gaza Strip
Populated places established in 1980
Religious Israeli settlements
Nahal settlements
Villages depopulated during the Arab–Israeli conflict